Philopotamus is a genus of insects in the family Philopotamidae.

The genus was described in 1829 by Stephens.

The genus has cosmopolitan distribution.

Species:
 Philopotamus montanus (Donovan 1813)

References

Trichoptera
Trichoptera genera